"Adams and Liberty" is considered the first significant campaign song in American political history, and served to support incumbent Federalist John Adams in the 1800 United States presidential election.

The lyrics are from Robert Treat Paine, Jr., to the tune of "To Anacreon in Heaven" (the same tune as the patriotic song and future national anthem "The Star-Spangled Banner".)

The country is poetically referred to as Columbia, and enduring national greatness depends on avoiding the evils of mercantilism, French alliances (see XYZ Affair), and political faction.  Other songs were used in subsequent presidential campaigns.

References

Sources
Silber, Irwin (1971). Songs America Voted By. Harrisburg, Pennsylvania: Stackpole Books.

1800 in the United States
1798 songs
Political party songs
Cultural depictions of John Adams
1800 United States presidential election